Nogales Municipality may refer to:

Nogales Municipality, Veracruz, Mexico
Nogales Municipality, Sonora, Mexico